Dale Meeks (born 16 November 1975) is an English television and theatre actor.

Acting career
Dale Meeks is a Geordie actor best known for his role as Simon Meredith in the British TV drama Emmerdale. and as the winner of ITV's Celebrity Stars in Their Eyes with Mark Charnock as the Blues Brothers.

He also starred in Byker Grove as the leader of a gang from rival youth club Denton Burn for 5 series and played Hips in the BBC series Breezeblock.

Meeks toured the UK with the musical Chicago and appeared in the West End production of Love Never Dies.
Dale can be seen in the upcoming series of George Gently as Panda

References

External links
 

English male stage actors
1975 births
Living people
English male child actors
English male soap opera actors
Male actors from Tyne and Wear
Actors from County Durham